Durability is the ability of a physical product to remain functional, without requiring excessive maintenance or repair, when faced with the challenges of normal operation over its design lifetime. There are several measures of durability in use, including years of life, hours of use, and number of operational cycles. In economics, goods with a long usable life are referred to as durable goods.

Requirements for product durability 
Product durability is predicated by good repairability and regenerability in conjunction with maintenance. Every durable product must be capable of adapting to technical, technological and design developments. This must be accompanied by a willingness on the part of consumers to forgo having the "very latest" version of a product.

In the United Kingdom, durability as a characteristic relating to the quality of goods that can be demanded by consumers was not clearly established until an amendment of the Sale of Goods Act 1979  relating to the quality standards for supplied goods in 1994.

Product life spans and sustainable consumption 
The lifespan of household goods is a significant factor in sustainable consumption. Longer product life spans can contribute to eco-efficiency and sufficiency, thus slowing consumption in order to progress towards a sustainable level of consumption. Cooper (2005) proposed a model to demonstrate the crucial role of product lifespans to sustainable production and consumption.

Types of durability
Durability can encompass several specific physical properties of designed products, including:

Ageing (of polymers)
Dust resistance
Resistance to fatigue
Fire resistance
Radiation hardening
Thermal resistance
Rot-proofing
Rustproofing
Toughness
Waterproofing

See also 

Availability
Consumables
Disposable product
Durable good
Interchangeable parts
Maintainability
Product life
Product stewardship
Throwaway society
Waste minimization

References

Broad-concept articles
Materials science
Waste minimisation